Federal Neuro-Psychiatric Hospital, Aro is a federal government of Nigeria speciality hospital located in Abeokuta, Ogun State, Nigeria. The current chief medical director is Taiwo Adamson.

History 
Federal Neuro-Psychiatric Hospital, Aro was established in 1944. The hospital was formerly known as an Administrative Prison/Asylum.

CMD 
The current chief medical director is Taiwo Adamson.

References 

Hospitals in Nigeria